Chauki Ganjor is a village near Tarwa, situated in Azamgarh district of Uttar Pradesh, India.It has 4 Pura(settlement area) 1 Chauki, 2 Basti, 3 Purub 4 Chauki Tehua. Nearest river is Beso. The village has  a dense population composed mainly of farmers.

Villages in Azamgarh district